Pla kaphong may refer to:
A generic name for Lutjanidae fish species in Thailand
Barramundi from local fish farms
Japanese lates
Nile perch
Datnioides polota, a tigerfish